The University of Toronto (UToronto or U of T) is a public research university in Toronto, Ontario, Canada, located on the grounds that surround Queen's Park. It was founded by royal charter in 1827 as King's College, the first institution of higher learning in Upper Canada. Originally controlled by the Church of England, the university assumed its present name in 1850 upon becoming a secular institution. As a collegiate university, it comprises 11 colleges each with substantial autonomy on financial and institutional affairs and significant differences in character and history. The university maintains three campuses, the oldest of which, St. George, is located in downtown Toronto. The other two satellite campuses are located in Scarborough and Mississauga. 

The University of Toronto offers over 700 undergraduate and 200 graduate programs. In all major rankings, the university consistently ranks in the top ten public universities in the world and as the top university in the country. It receives the most annual scientific research funding and endowment of any Canadian university and is one of two members of the Association of American Universities outside the United States, the other being McGill University in Montreal.

Academically, the University of Toronto is noted for influential movements and curricula in literary criticism and communication theory, known collectively as the Toronto School. The university was the birthplace of insulin and stem cell research, the first artificial cardiac pacemaker, and the site of the first successful lung transplant and nerve transplant. The university was also home to the first electron microscope, the development of deep learning, neural network, multi-touch technology, the identification of the first black hole Cygnus X-1, and the development of the theory of NP-completeness.

The Varsity Blues are the athletic teams that represent the university in intercollegiate league matches, primarily within U Sports, with ties to gridiron football, rowing and ice hockey. The earliest recorded instance of gridiron football occurred at University of Toronto's University College in November 1861. The university's Hart House is an early example of the North American student centre, simultaneously serving cultural, intellectual, and recreational interests within its large Gothic-revival complex.

University of Toronto alumni include three Governors General of Canada, five Prime Ministers of Canada, including William Lyon Mackenzie King and Lester B. Pearson, nine foreign leaders, and 17 justices of the Supreme Court of Canada. , 12 Nobel laureates, six Turing Award winners, 94 Rhodes Scholars, and one Fields Medalist have been affiliated with the university.

History

Early history
The founding of a colonial college had long been the desire of John Graves Simcoe, the first Lieutenant-Governor of Upper Canada and founder of York, the colonial capital. As an Oxford-educated military commander who had fought in the American Revolutionary War, Simcoe believed a college was needed to counter the spread of republicanism from the United States. The Upper Canada Executive Committee recommended in 1798 that a college be established in York.

On March 15, 1827, a royal charter was formally issued by King George IV, proclaiming "from this time one College, with the style and privileges of a University ... for the education of youth in the principles of the Christian Religion, and for their instruction in the various branches of Science and Literature ... to continue for ever, to be called King's College." The granting of the charter was largely the result of intense lobbying by John Strachan, the influential Anglican Bishop of Toronto who took office as the college's first president. The original three-storey Greek Revival school building was built on the present site of Queen's Park.

Under Strachan's stewardship, King's College was a religious institution closely aligned with the Church of England and the British colonial elite, known as the Family Compact. Reformist politicians opposed the clergy's control over colonial institutions and fought to have the college secularized. In 1849, after a lengthy and heated debate, the newly elected responsible government of the Province of Canada voted to rename King's College as the University of Toronto and severed the school's ties with the church. Having anticipated this decision, the enraged Strachan had resigned a year earlier to open Trinity College as a private Anglican seminary. University College was created as the nondenominational teaching branch of the University of Toronto. During the American Civil War, the threat of Union blockade on British North America  prompted the creation of the University Rifle Corps, which saw battle in resisting the Fenian raids on the Niagara border in 1866. The Corps was part of the Reserve Militia led by Professor Henry Croft.

Established in 1878, the School of Practical Science was the precursor to the Faculty of Applied Science and Engineering, which has been nicknamed Skule since its earliest days. While the Faculty of Medicine opened in 1843, medical teaching was conducted by proprietary schools from 1853 until 1887 when the faculty absorbed the Toronto School of Medicine. Meanwhile, the university continued to set examinations and confer medical degrees.  The university opened the Faculty of Law in 1887, followed by the Faculty of Dentistry in 1888 when the Royal College of Dental Surgeons became an affiliate. Women were first admitted to the university in 1884.

A devastating fire in 1890 gutted the interior of University College and destroyed 33,000 volumes from the library, but the university restored the building and replenished its library within two years. Over the next two decades, a collegiate system took shape as the university arranged federation with several ecclesiastical colleges, including Strachan's Trinity College in 1904. The university operated the Royal Conservatory of Music from 1896 to 1991 and the Royal Ontario Museum from 1912 to 1968; both still retain close ties with the university as independent institutions. The University of Toronto Press was founded in 1901 as Canada's first academic publishing house. The Faculty of Forestry, founded in 1907 with Bernhard Fernow as dean, was Canada's first university faculty devoted to forest science. In 1910, the Faculty of Education opened its laboratory school, the University of Toronto Schools.

World wars and post-war years

The First and Second World Wars curtailed some university activities as undergraduate and graduate men eagerly enlisted. Intercollegiate athletic competitions and the Hart House Debates were suspended, although exhibition and interfaculty games were still held. The David Dunlap Observatory in Richmond Hill opened in 1935, followed by the University of Toronto Institute for Aerospace Studies in 1949. 

By the 1961–62 academic year, the university had a total enrolment of 14,302 students, including 1,531 graduate students. The university opened suburban campuses in Scarborough in 1964 and in Mississauga in 1967. The university's former affiliated schools at the Ontario Agricultural College and Glendon Hall became fully independent of the University of Toronto and became part of University of Guelph in 1964 and York University in 1965, respectively. Beginning in the 1980s, reductions in government funding prompted more rigorous fundraising efforts.

Since 2000
In 2000, geophysicist Kin-Yip Chun was reinstated as a professor of the university, after he launched an unsuccessful lawsuit against the university alleging racial discrimination. In 2017, a human rights application was filed against the University by one of its students for allegedly delaying the investigation of sexual assault and being dismissive of their concerns. In 2018, the university cleared one of its professors of allegations of discrimination and antisemitism in an internal investigation, after a complaint was filed by one of its students.

The University of Toronto was the first Canadian university to amass a financial endowment greater than one billion dollars in 2007. On September 24, 2020, the university announced a $250 million gift to the Faculty of Medicine from businessman and philanthropist James C. Temerty, the largest single philanthropic donation in Canadian history. This broke the previous record for the school set in 2019 when Gerry Schwartz and Heather Reisman jointly donated $100 million for the creation of a  innovation and artificial intelligence centre.

Grounds

The site encompasses  bounded mostly by Bay Street to the east, Bloor Street to the north, Spadina Avenue to the west and College Street to the south. An enclave surrounded by university grounds, Queen's Park, contains the Ontario Legislative Building and several historic monuments. With its green spaces and many interlocking courtyards, the university forms a distinct region of urban parkland in the city's downtown core. The namesake University Avenue is a ceremonial boulevard and arterial thoroughfare that runs through downtown between Queen's Park and Front Street.

The architecture is epitomized by a combination of Romanesque and Gothic Revival buildings spread across the eastern and central portions of campus, most dating between 1858 and 1929. The traditional heart of the university, known as Front Campus, is near the campus centre in an oval lawn enclosed by King's College Circle. The centrepiece is the main building of University College, built in 1857 with an eclectic blend of Richardsonian Romanesque and Norman architectural elements. The dramatic effect of this blended design by architect Frederick William Cumberland drew praise from European visitors of the time: "Until I reached Toronto," remarked Lord Dufferin during his visit in 1872, "I confess I was not aware that so magnificent a specimen of architecture existed upon the American continent." The building was declared a National Historic Site of Canada in 1968. Built in 1907, Convocation Hall is recognizable for its domed roof and Ionic-pillared rotunda. Although its foremost function is hosting the annual convocation ceremonies, the building is a venue for academic and social events throughout the year. The sandstone buildings of Knox College epitomizes the North American collegiate Gothic design, with its characteristic cloisters surrounding a secluded courtyard.

A lawn at the northeast is anchored by Hart House, a Gothic-revival student centre complex. Among its many common rooms, the building's Great Hall is noted for large stained-glass windows and a long quotation from John Milton's Areopagitica inscribed around the walls. The tower houses a 51-bell carillon played on special occasions such as Remembrance Day and convocation. North of University College, the main building of Trinity College displays Jacobethan Tudor architecture, while its chapel was built in the Perpendicular Gothic style of Giles Gilbert Scott. The chapel features exterior walls of sandstone and interiors of Indiana Limestone and was built by Italian stonemasons using ancient building methods. Philosopher's Walk is a scenic footpath that follows a meandering, wooded ravine, the buried Taddle Creek, linking with Trinity College, Varsity Arena and the Faculty of Law. Victoria College is on the eastern side of Queen's Park, centred on a Romanesque main building made of contrasting red sandstone and grey limestone.

Developed after the Second World War, the western section of the campus consists mainly of modernist and internationalist structures that house laboratories and faculty offices. The most significant example of Brutalist architecture is the massive Robarts Library complex, built in 1972 and opened a year later in 1973. It features raised podia, extensive use of triangular geometric designs and a towering 14-storey concrete structure that cantilevers above a field of open space and mature trees. Sidney Smith Hall is the home to the Faculty of Arts and Science, as well as a few departments within the faculty. The Leslie L. Dan Pharmacy Building, completed in 2006, exhibits the high-tech architectural style of glass and steel by British architect Norman Foster.

Governance and colleges

The University of Toronto has traditionally been a decentralized institution, with governing authority shared among its central administration, academic faculties and colleges. The Governing Council is the unicameral legislative organ of the central administration, overseeing general academic, business and institutional affairs. Before 1971, the university was governed under a bicameral system composed of the board of governors and the university senate. The chancellor, usually a former governor general, lieutenant governor, premier or diplomat, is the ceremonial head of the university. The president is appointed by the council as the chief executive.

Unlike most North American institutions, the University of Toronto is a collegiate university with a model that resembles those of the University of Cambridge and the University of Oxford in Britain. The colleges hold substantial autonomy over admissions, scholarships, programs and other academic and financial affairs, in addition to the housing and social duties of typical residential colleges. The system emerged in the 19th century, as ecclesiastical colleges considered various forms of union with the University of Toronto to ensure their viability. The desire to preserve religious traditions in a secular institution resulted in the federative collegiate model that came to characterize the university.

University College was the founding nondenominational college, created in 1853 after the university was secularized. Knox College, a Presbyterian institution, and Wycliffe College, a low church seminary, both encouraged their students to study for non-divinity degrees at University College. In 1885, they entered a formal affiliation with the University of Toronto, and became federated schools in 1890. The idea of federation initially met strong opposition at Victoria University, a Methodist school in Cobourg, but a financial incentive in 1890 convinced the school to join. Decades after the death of John Strachan, the Anglican seminary Trinity College entered federation in 1904, followed in 1910 by St. Michael's College, a Roman Catholic college founded by the Basilian Fathers. Among the institutions that had considered federation but ultimately remained independent were McMaster University, a Baptist school that later moved to Hamilton, and Queen's College, a Presbyterian school in Kingston that later became Queen's University.

The post-war era saw the creation of New College in 1962, Innis College in 1964 and Woodsworth College in 1974, all of them nondenominational. Along with University College, they comprise the university's constituent colleges, which are established and funded by the central administration and are therefore financially dependent. Massey College was established in 1963 by the Massey Foundation as a college exclusively for graduate students. Regis College, a Jesuit seminary, entered federation with the university in 1979.

In contrast with the constituent colleges, the colleges of Knox, Massey, Regis, St. Michael's, Trinity, Victoria and Wycliffe continue to exist as legally distinct entities, each possessing a separate financial endowment. While St. Michael's, Trinity and Victoria continue to recognize their religious affiliations and heritage, they have since adopted secular policies of enrolment and teaching in non-divinity subjects. Some colleges have, or once had, collegiate structures of their own: Emmanuel College is a college of Victoria and St. Hilda's College is part of Trinity; St. Joseph's College had existed as a college within St. Michael's until it was dissolved in 2006. Ewart College existed as an affiliated college until 1991, when it was merged into Knox College. Postgraduate theology degrees are conferred by the colleges of Knox, Regis and Wycliffe, along with the divinity faculties within Emmanuel, St. Michael's and Trinity, including joint degrees with the university through the Toronto School of Theology.

Academics

The Faculty of Arts and Science is the university's main undergraduate faculty, and administers most of the courses in the college system. While the colleges are not entirely responsible for teaching duties, most of them house specialized academic programs and lecture series. Among other subjects, Trinity College is associated with programs in international relations, as are University College with Canadian studies, Victoria College with Renaissance studies, Innis College with film studies and urban studies, New College with gender studies, Woodsworth College with industrial relations and St. Michael's College with Medievalism. The faculty teaches undergraduate commerce in collaboration with the Rotman School of Management. The Faculty of Applied Science and Engineering is the other major direct-entry undergraduate faculty.

The University of Toronto is the birthplace of an influential school of thought on communication theory and literary criticism known as the Toronto School. Described as "the theory of the primacy of communication in the structuring of human cultures and the structuring of the human mind", the school is rooted in the works of Eric A. Havelock and Harold Innis and the subsequent contributions of Edmund Snow Carpenter, Northrop Frye and Marshall McLuhan. Since 1963, the McLuhan Program in Culture and Technology of the Faculty of Information has carried the mandate for teaching and advancing the Toronto School.

Several notable works in arts and humanities are based at the university, including the Dictionary of Canadian Biography since 1959 and the Collected Works of Erasmus since 1969. The Records of Early English Drama collects and edits the surviving documentary evidence of dramatic arts in pre-Puritan England, while the Dictionary of Old English compiles the early vocabulary of the English language from the Anglo-Saxon period.

The Munk School of Global Affairs encompasses the university's various programs and curricula in international affairs and foreign policy. As the Cold War heightened, Toronto's Slavic studies program evolved into an important institution on Soviet politics and economics, financed by the Rockefeller, Ford and Mellon foundations.  The Munk School is also home to the G20 Research Group, which conducts independent monitoring and analysis on the Group of Twenty, and the Citizen Lab, which conducts research on Internet censorship as a joint founder of the OpenNet Initiative. The university operates international offices in Berlin, Hong Kong and Siena.

The Dalla Lana School of Public Health is a Faculty of the University of Toronto that began as one of the Schools of Hygiene begun by the Rockefeller Foundation in 1927. The School went through a dramatic renaissance after the 2003 SARS crisis, and it is now Canada's largest public health school, with more than 750 faculty, 800 students, and research and training partnerships with institutions throughout Toronto and the world. With more than $39 million in research funding per year, the School supports discovery in global health, tobacco impacts on health, occupational disease and disability, air pollution, inner city, circumpolar health, and many other pressing issues in population health.

The Temerty Faculty of Medicine is affiliated with a network of ten teaching hospitals, providing medical treatment, research and advisory services to patients and clients from Canada and abroad. A core member of the network is University Health Network, itself a specialized federation of Toronto General Hospital, Princess Margaret Cancer Centre, Toronto Western Hospital, and Toronto Rehabilitation Institute. Physicians in the medical institutes have cross-appointments to faculty and supervisory positions in university departments. The Rotman School of Management developed the discipline and methodology of integrative thinking, upon which the school bases its curriculum. Founded in 1887, the Faculty of Law's emphasis on formal teachings of liberal arts and legal theory was then considered unconventional, but gradually helped shift the country's legal education system away from the apprenticeship model that prevailed until the mid-20th century. The Ontario Institute for Studies in Education is the teachers college of the university, affiliated with its two laboratory schools, the Institute of Child Study and the University of Toronto Schools (a private high school run by the university). Autonomous institutes at the university include the Canadian Institute for Theoretical Astrophysics, the Pontifical Institute of Mediaeval Studies and the Fields Institute.

Within the Faculty of Arts and Science, notable departments include the Department of Mathematics.

Library and collections

The University of Toronto Libraries is the third-largest academic library system in North America, following those of Harvard and Yale, measured by number of volumes held. Its collections include more than 12 million print books, 1.9 million digital books, over 160,000 journal titles, and close to 30,000 metres of archival materials. The largest of the libraries, Robarts Library, holds about five million bound volumes that form the main collection for humanities and social sciences. The Thomas Fisher Rare Book Library constitutes one of the largest repositories of publicly accessible rare books and manuscripts. Its collections range from ancient Egyptian papyri to incunabula and libretti; the subjects of focus include British, Western and Canadian literature, Aristotle, Darwin, the Spanish Civil War, the history of science and medicine, Canadiana and the history of books. The Cheng Yu Tung East Asian Library has a rare 40,000-volume Chinese collection from the Song Dynasty (960–1279) to the Qing Dynasty (1644–1911) that was originally held by scholar Mu Xuexun (1880–1929). The Richard Charles Lee Canada-Hong Kong Library has the largest research collection for Hong Kong and Canada–Hong Kong studies outside of Hong Kong. The rest of the library collections are dispersed at departmental and faculty libraries in addition to about 1.3 million bound volumes the colleges hold. The university has collaborated with the Internet Archive since 2005 to digitize some of its library holdings.

Housed within University College, the University of Toronto Art Centre contains three major art collections. The Malcove Collection is primarily represented by Early Christian and Byzantine sculptures, bronzeware, furniture, icons and liturgical items. It also includes glassware and stone reliefs from the Greco-Roman period, and the painting Adam and Eve by Lucas Cranach the Elder, dated from 1538. The University of Toronto Collection features Canadian contemporary art, while the University College Art Collection holds significant works by the Group of Seven and 19th century landscape artists.

Reputation

In the 2022 Academic Ranking of World Universities (also known as the Shanghai Ranking), the university ranked 22nd in the world and first in Canada. The 2023 QS World University Rankings ranked the university 34th in the world, and second in Canada. In 2019, it ranked 11th among the universities around the world by SCImago Institutions Rankings. The 2023 Times Higher Education World University Rankings ranked the university 18th in the world, and first in Canada. In the Times' 2020 reputational ranking, the publication placed the university 19th in the world. In the 2022–23 U.S. News & World Report Best Global University Ranking, the university ranked 18th in the world, and first in Canada. The Canadian-based Maclean's magazine ranked the University of Toronto second in their 2022–2023 Medical Doctoral university category. Maclean's 2023 university rankings also ranked the University of Toronto first in its reputation survey. The university was ranked in spite of having opted out—along with several other universities in Canada—of participating in Maclean's graduate survey since 2006.

The university's research performance has been noted in several bibliometric university rankings, which use citation analysis to evaluate the impact a university has on academic publications. In 2019, the Performance Ranking of Scientific Papers for World Universities ranked the university fourth in the world, and first in Canada. The University Ranking by Academic Performance 2019–2020 rankings placed the university second in the world, and first in Canada.

Along with academic and research-based rankings, the university has also been ranked by publications that evaluate the employment prospects of its graduates. In the Times Higher Education's 2022 global employability ranking, the university ranked 11th in the world, and first in Canada. In QS's 2022 graduate employability ranking, the university ranked 21st in the world, and first in Canada. In a 2013 employment survey conducted by the New York Times, the University of Toronto was ranked 14th in the world.

In 2018, the University of Toronto Entrepreneurship was ranked the fourth best university-based incubator in the world by UBI Global in the "World Top Business Incubator – Managed by a University" category.

Research

Since 1926, the University of Toronto has been a member of the Association of American Universities, a consortium of the leading North American research universities. The university manages by far the largest annual research budget of any university in Canada with sponsored direct-cost expenditures of $878 million in 2010. In 2021, the University of Toronto was named the top research university in Canada by Research Infosource, with a sponsored research income (external sources of funding) of $1,234.278 million in 2020. In the same year, the university's faculty averaged a sponsored research income of $446,600, while graduate students averaged a sponsored research income of $61,000. The federal government was the largest source of funding, with grants from the Canadian Institutes of Health Research, the Natural Sciences and Engineering Research Council and the Social Sciences and Humanities Research Council amounting to about one-third of the research budget. About eight per cent of research funding came from corporations, mostly in the healthcare industry.

The first practical electron microscope was built by the physics department in 1938. During World War II, the university developed the G-suit, a life-saving garment worn by Allied fighter plane pilots, later adopted for use by astronauts. Development of the infrared chemiluminescence technique improved analyses of energy behaviours in chemical reactions. In 1963, the asteroid 2104 Toronto is discovered in the David Dunlap Observatory in Richmond Hill and is named after the university. In 1972, studies on Cygnus X-1 led to the publication of the first observational evidence proving the existence of black holes. Toronto astronomers have also discovered the Uranian moons of Caliban and Sycorax, the dwarf galaxies of Andromeda I, II and III, and the supernova SN 1987A. A pioneer in computing technology, the university designed and built UTEC, one of the world's first operational computers, and later purchased Ferut, the second commercial computer after UNIVAC I. Multi-touch technology was developed at Toronto, with applications ranging from handheld devices to high-end drawing monitors to collaboration walls. The AeroVelo Atlas, which won the Igor I. Sikorsky Human Powered Helicopter Competition in 2013, was developed by the university's team of students and graduates and was tested in Vaughan.

The discovery of insulin at the University of Toronto in 1921 is considered among the most significant events in the history of medicine. The stem cell was discovered at the university in 1963, forming the basis for bone marrow transplantation and all subsequent research on adult and embryonic stem cells. This was the first of many findings at Toronto relating to stem cells, including the identification of pancreatic and retinal stem cells. The cancer stem cell was first identified in 1997 by Toronto researchers, who have since found stem cell associations in leukemia, brain tumours and colorectal cancer. Medical inventions developed at Toronto include the glycaemic index, the infant cereal Pablum, the use of protective hypothermia in open heart surgery and the first artificial cardiac pacemaker. The first successful single-lung transplant was performed at Toronto in 1981, followed by the first nerve transplant in 1988, and the first double-lung transplant in 1989. Researchers identified the maturation promoting factor that regulates cell division, and discovered the T-cell receptor, which triggers responses of the immune system. The university is credited with isolating the genes that cause Fanconi anemia, cystic fibrosis and early-onset Alzheimer's disease, among numerous other diseases. Between 1914 and 1972, the university operated the Connaught Medical Research Laboratories, now part of the pharmaceutical corporation Sanofi-Aventis. Among the research conducted at the laboratory was the development of gel electrophoresis.

The University of Toronto is the primary research presence that supports one of the world's largest concentrations of biotechnology firms. More than 5,000 principal investigators reside within  from the university grounds in Toronto's Discovery District, conducting $1 billion of medical research annually. MaRS Discovery District is a research park that serves commercial enterprises and the university's technology transfer ventures. In 2008, the university disclosed 159 inventions and had 114 active start-up companies. Its SciNet Consortium operates the most powerful supercomputer in Canada.

Culture and student life

In the heart of social, cultural and recreational life at the University of Toronto lies Hart House, the sprawling neo-Gothic student activity centre that was conceived by alumnus-benefactor Vincent Massey and named for his grandfather Hart. Opened in 1919, the complex established a communitarian spirit in the university and its students, who at the time kept largely within their own colleges under the decentralized collegiate system. At Hart House, a student can read in the library, dine casually or, formally, have a haircut, visit the art gallery, watch a play in the theatre, listen to a concert, observe or join in debates, play billiards, or go for a swim and find a place to study, all under the same roof and within the span of a day. The confluence of assorted functions is the result of a deliberate effort to create a holistic educational experience, a goal summarized in the Founders' Prayer. The Hart House model was influential in the planning of student centres at other universities, notably Cornell University's Willard Straight Hall.

Hart House resembles some traditional aspects of student representation through its financial support of student clubs, and its standing committees and board of stewards that are composed mostly of undergraduate students. However, the main students' unions on administrative and policy issues are the University of Toronto Students' Union, Association of Part-time Undergraduate Students and the Graduate Students' Union. Student representative bodies also exist at the various colleges, academic faculties and departments.

The Hart House Debating Club employs a debating style that combines the American emphasis on analysis and the British use of wit. Smaller debating societies at Trinity, University and Victoria College have served as initial training grounds for debaters who later progress to Hart House. The club won the World Universities Debating Championship in 1981 and 2006. The North American Model United Nations (NAMUN) hosts an annual Model United Nations conference on campus, while the United Nations Society participates in various North American and international conferences. The Toronto chess team has captured the top title six times at the Pan American Intercollegiate Team Chess Championship. The Formula SAE Racing Team won the Formula Student European Championships in 2003, 2005 and 2006.

Greek life
The University of Toronto is home to the first collegiate fraternity in Canada, Zeta Psi, whose Toronto chapter has been active since 1879. Other fraternity chapters at the University of Toronto include Alpha Delta Phi, Alpha Epsilon Pi, Delta Kappa Epsilon, Sigma Chi, Delta Upsilon, Phi Delta Theta, Phi Kappa Sigma, Phi Gamma Delta, Psi Upsilon, Beta Theta Pi, Phi Kappa Pi, Kappa Sigma, Lambda Phi Epsilon, Sigma Nu, Theta Delta Chi, Alpha Kappa Nu, Alpha Omicron Pi, Delta Delta Delta, Pi Beta Phi and Lambda Chi Alpha. Other Greek-letter societies include Alpha Gamma Delta, Alpha Phi, Alpha Sigma Nu, Delta Phi Nu, Gamma Phi Beta, Kappa Alpha Society, Delta Psi Delta, Gamma Delta Nu, Kappa Phi Xi, Delta Pi, Chi Sigma Xi, Zeta Beta Omega, Kappa Kappa Gamma, and alpha Kappa Delta Phi. A secret society known as Episkopon has operated from Trinity College since 1858.

Theatre and music

Hart House Theatre is the university's student amateur theatre, generally producing four major plays every season. As old as Hart House itself, the theatre is considered a pioneer in Canadian theatre for introducing the Little Theatre Movement from Europe. It has cultivated numerous performing-arts talents, including Donald Sutherland, Lorne Michaels, Wayne and Shuster and William Hutt. Three members of the Group of Seven painters (Harris, Lismer and MacDonald) have been set designers at the theatre, and composer Healey Willan was director of music for 14  productions. The theatre also hosts annual variety shows run by several student theatrical companies at the colleges and academic faculties, the most prominent of which are U.C. Follies of University College, Skule Nite of the Faculty of Engineering, and Daffydil of the Faculty of Medicine, the latter in its 100th year of production in 2010–2011.

The main musical ensembles at Hart House are the orchestra, the chamber strings, the chorus, the jazz choir, the jazz ensemble and the symphonic band. The Jazz at Oscar's concert series performs big band and vocal jazz on Friday nights at the period lounge and bar of the Hart House Arbor Room. Open Stage is the monthly open mic event featuring singers, comics, poets and storytellers. The Sunday Concert is the oldest musical series at Hart House; since 1922, the series has performed more than 600 classical music concerts in the Great Hall, freely attended by the university community and general audiences. The public may also screen midday events held at noon, when concerts are recited prior to formal debut.

Student media

The Varsity is one of Canada's oldest student-run newspapers, in publication since 1880. The paper was originally a daily broadsheet, but has since adopted a compact format and is now weekly during the Fall and Winter semesters. It publishes online in the summer. Hart House Review, a literary magazine, publishes prose, poetry, and visual art from emerging Canadian writers and artists. The Newspaper is an independent student-run community newspaper, published weekly since 1978. CIUT-FM is the university's campus radio station, while the University of Toronto Television broadcasts student-produced content. Students at each college and academic faculty also produce their own set of journals and news publications. University College's The Gargoyle was an early training ground for such notables as journalist and author Naomi Klein and musician/comedian Paul Shaffer. Victoria University's Acta Victoriana is the oldest active literary journal in Canada, and provided first publication credits to such literary figures as Margaret Atwood and Northrop Frye. Juxtaposition Global Health Magazine is another peer-reviewed student publication at the campus. The magazine focuses on global health and international development, and is published in association with the university's Centre for International Health.

Members of the student press have contributed to activist causes on several notable occasions. At the height of debate on coeducation in 1880, The Varsity published an article in its inaugural issue voicing in favour of admitting women. In 1895, the university suspended the editor of The Varsity for breach of collegiality, after he published a letter that harshly criticized the provincial government's dismissal of a professor and involvement in academic affairs. University College students then approved a motion by Varsity staff member and future Prime Minister William Lyon Mackenzie King and boycotted lectures for a week. After Prime Minister Pierre Trudeau decriminalized homosexuality throughout Canada in 1969, a medical research assistant placed an advertisement in The Varsity seeking volunteers to establish the first university homophile association in Canada.

Student social media
Several Facebook pages that posts memes about student life at the university were created in the 2010s, particularly True , and has impacted the student culture of the institution.

Residences

Each college at the University of Toronto operates its own set of residence halls and dining halls clustered in a different area of the campus. Innis, New, St. Michael's, Trinity, University, Victoria, and Woodsworth colleges reserve most of their dormitories for their undergraduate students within the Faculty of Arts and Science while setting a portion available to students from the professional and postgraduate faculties. Massey College is exclusively for graduate students, while Knox and Wycliffe Colleges mainly house graduate theology students. Annesley Hall of Victoria College, a National Historic Site, was the first university residence for women in Canada. After St. Hilda's College became coeducational in 2005, Annesley Hall and Loretto College of St. Michael's College are the last remaining women's halls at the university.

As campus residences accommodate just 6,400 students in all, the university guarantees housing only for undergraduates in their first year of study, while most upper-year and graduate students reside off-campus. Traditionally, the adjacent neighbourhoods of The Annex and Harbord Village are popular settling grounds for University of Toronto students, forming a distinct student quarter enclave, though Chinatown and Kensington Market are increasingly populated by students. In 2004, the university purchased and converted a nearby hotel in the district that would later become Little Japan to the south into the Chestnut Residence, which houses students from all colleges and faculties. There are also numerous fraternity houses and student housing cooperatives, where boarders pay reduced rent for assuming housekeeping duties.

Demographics
The University of Toronto is known for having a high enrolment of international students. In 2016–17, 19.7 per cent of students were international. The University planNed to grow its international enrolment to 20.1 per cent by 2021–22. In 2017, the University of Toronto had more international students enrolled than all other Canadian post-secondary institutions.

In 2011, 78 per cent of incoming first-year students identified as a visible minority.

In 2001–02, the overall gender ratio was about 57.1 per cent female to 42.9 per cent male for enrolled students, or about 15 males for every 20 females. This gender gap has improved slightly in recent years to 55.8 per cent female and 44.2 per cent male, or about 16 males for every 20 females in 2014–15 (non-binary genders were not reported). This gap is more pronounced for graduation rates, with 59 per cent of degrees conferred on females. Gender ratios also depend on undergraduate versus graduate enrolment, and department.

The overall average of high school grades for first-year students was about 86 per cent for fall 2014. The retention rate was 92.1 per cent.

In 2011–12, 40.3 per cent of the students were enrolled in the Social Science and Humanities departments, 23.9 per cent were enrolled in Biology, Engineering, and Mathematics & Physical Sciences. General education accounted for 14.7 per cent enrolment (all undergraduates). Health Professions was 12.7 per cent, Education 5.8 per cent, and Fine Arts 2.6 per cent.

Campus suicides
The University of Toronto has faced significant criticism of its handling of student suicides and students' mental health problems. From 2017 to 2019, four students committed suicide at the school, three of them in the Bahen Centre for Information Technology. Student advocacy groups have said that the university contributed to the suicides by failing to provide mental health resources, with computer science student Shahin Imtiaz saying in an interview that "the university has turned into a pressure-cooker of intense demands, without the resources to meet the student needs to back it up." While the university does not generally acknowledge student deaths as suicides, the university responded to the deaths by adding additional safety barriers to the Bahen Centre and by promising additional support, adding close to three million dollars in funding for student wellbeing.

Athletics

The 44 sports teams of the Varsity Blues represent the university in intercollegiate competitions. The two main leagues in which the Blues participate are U Sports (formerly known as Canadian Interuniversity Sport (CIS)) for national competitions and the auxiliary Ontario University Athletics (OUA) conference at the provincial level. The athletic nickname of Varsity Blues was not consistently used until the 1930s; previously, references such as "Varsity", "The Big Blue", "The Blue and White", "The Varsity Blue" and simply "The Blues" also appeared interchangeably. The Blue and White is commonly played and sung in athletic games as a fight song.

North American (gridiron) football traces its very origin to the University of Toronto with the first documented football game played at University College on November 9, 1861. The Blues played their first intercollegiate football match in 1877 against the University of Michigan in a game that ended with a scoreless draw. Since intercollegiate seasons began in 1898, the Blues have won four Grey Cup, two Vanier Cup and 25 Yates Cup championships, including the inaugural championships for all three trophies. However, the football team has hit a rough patch following its last championship in 1993. From 2001 until 2008, the Blues suffered the longest losing streak in Canadian collegiate history, recording 49 consecutive winless games. This was preceded by a single victory in 2001 that ended a run of 18 straight losses. The site of Varsity Stadium has served as the primary playing grounds of the Varsity Blues football and soccer programs since 1898. It also served as the venue for archery during the 2015 Pan American Games.

Formed in 1891, the storied Varsity Blues men's ice hockey team has left many legacies on the national, professional and international hockey scenes. Conn Smythe played for the Blues as a centre during his undergraduate years, and was a Blues coach from 1923 to 1926. When Smythe took over the Toronto Maple Leafs in 1927, his new team adopted the Varsity Blues' familiar blue-and-white sweater design. Blues hockey competed at the 1928 Winter Olympics and captured the gold medal for Canada. At the 1980 Winter Olympics, Blues coach Tom Watt served as co-coach of the Canadian hockey team in which six players were Varsity grads. In all, the Blues have won the U Sports University Cup national hockey title ten times, last in 1984. Varsity Arena has been the permanent home of the Blues ice hockey programs since it opened in 1926. In men's basketball, the Varsity Blues have won 14 conference titles, including the inaugural championship in 1909, but have not won a national title. In swimming, the men's team has claimed the national crown 16 times since 1964, while the women's team has claimed the crown 14 times since 1970. Established in 1897, the University of Toronto Rowing Club is Canada's oldest collegiate rowing club. It earned a silver medal for the country in the 1924 Summer Olympics, finishing second to Yale's crew.

The back campus of University College was used for field hockey during the 2015 Pan American Games and the field was renamed Pan Am / Parapan Am Fields for the duration of the Pan American Games.

Notable people

In addition to Havelock, Innis, Frye, Carpenter and McLuhan, former professors of the 20th century include Frederick Banting, Harold Scott MacDonald Coxeter, Robertson Davies, John Charles Fields, Leopold Infeld and C. B. Macpherson. Twelve Nobel laureates studied or taught at the University of Toronto. As of 2006, University of Toronto academics accounted for 15 of 23 Canadian members in the American Academy of Arts and Sciences (65 per cent) and 20 of 72 Canadian fellows in the American Association for the Advancement of Science (28 per cent).  Among honorees from Canada between 1980 and 2006, University of Toronto faculty made up 11 of 21 Canada Gairdner International Award recipients (52 per cent), 44 of 101 Guggenheim Fellows (44 per cent), 16 of 38 Royal Society fellows (42 per cent), 10 of 28 members in the United States National Academies (36 per cent) and 23 of 77 Sloan Research Fellows (30 per cent).

Alumni of the University of Toronto's colleges, faculties and professional schools have assumed notable roles in a wide range of fields and specialties. In government, Governors General Vincent Massey, Adrienne Clarkson, and Julie Payette, Prime Ministers William Lyon Mackenzie King, Arthur Meighen, Lester B. Pearson, Paul Martin and Stephen Harper, and 17 Justices of the Supreme Court have all graduated from the university, while world leaders include President of Latvia Vaira Vīķe-Freiberga, Premier of the Republic of China Liu Chao-shiuan, President of Trinidad and Tobago Noor Hassanali, and First Lady of Iceland Eliza Reid. Economist John Kenneth Galbraith, political scientist David Easton, historian Margaret MacMillan, philosophers David Gauthier and Ted Honderich, anthropologist Davidson Black, social activist Ellen Pence, sociologist Erving Goffman, psychologists Endel Tulving, Daniel Schacter, and Lisa Feldman Barrett, physicians Norman Bethune and Charles Best, geologists Joseph Tyrrell and John Tuzo Wilson, mathematicians Irving Kaplansky and William Kahan, physicists Arthur Leonard Schawlow and Bertram Brockhouse, religion scholar Amir Hussain, architect James Strutt, engineer Gerald Bull, computer scientists Alfred Aho and Brian Kernighan, and astronauts Roberta Bondar and Julie Payette are also some of the most well-known academic figures from the university.

In business, University of Toronto alumni include Rogers Communications' Ted Rogers, Toronto-Dominion Bank's W. Edmund Clark, Bank of Montreal's Bill Downe, Scotiabank's Peter Godsoe, Barrick Gold's Peter Munk, BlackBerry's Jim Balsillie, eBay's Jeffrey Skoll, Fiat S.p.A.'s Sergio Marchionne, and Apotex's Bernard Sherman. In literature and media, the university has produced writers Stephen Leacock, John McCrae, Rohinton Mistry, Margaret Atwood and Michael Ondaatje, film directors Arthur Hiller, Norman Jewison, David Cronenberg and Atom Egoyan, actor Donald Sutherland, screenwriter David Shore, television producer and writer Hart Hanson, musician Paul Shaffer, and journalists Malcolm Gladwell, Naomi Klein and Barbara Amiel.

The University of Toronto alumni-founded companies generate roughly equivalent to one-quarter of the Canadian GDP according to a survey published in 2021.

See also

 Education in Toronto
 Higher education in Ontario
 List of universities in Ontario
 University of Toronto Campus Safety

Notes

References

Further reading

 Bissell, Claude T. (1974). Halfway up Parnassus: A Personal Account of the University of Toronto. University of Toronto Press. .
 Ford, Ann Rochon. (1985). A Path Not Strewn with Roses. University of Toronto Press. .
 Friedland, Martin L. (2002).  The University of Toronto: A History. University of Toronto Press. .
 Levi, Charles Morden. (2003). Comings and Goings. McGill-Queen's University Press. .
 McKillop, A. Brian. (1994). Matters of Mind. University of Toronto Press. .
 Slater, John G. (2005). Minerva's Aviary: Philosophy at Toronto. University of Toronto Press. .
 Wallace, W. Stewart. A History of the University of Toronto, 1827–1927. University of Toronto Press, 1927.

External links

 

 
Universities in Canada
Toronto, University
Toronto, University
Forestry education
1827 establishments in Upper Canada
Universities in Ontario
Toronto